Sivantha Malar is a 1992 Tamil-language drama film directed by Sasi Mohan, written by Selva and produced by K. R. Gangadharan. The film stars Sarathkumar and Gautami, while Vijayakumar and Srividya play supporting roles. It was released on 6 March 1992.

Cast
Sarathkumar as Vijay
Gautami as Prabha
Vijayakumar
Srividya
Goundamani
Senthil
Delhi Ganesh
Thalaivasal Vijay

Soundtrack

The film score and the soundtrack were composed by Maragadha Mani. The soundtrack released in 1992.
"Edhuvarai Pogum" - S. P. Balasubrahmanyam, K. S. Chithra
"Oru Nimisham" - K. S. Chithra
"Eriyude" - SPB, K. S. Chithra
"Oru Paattu" - SPB, K. S. Chithra

Reception
The Indian Express wrote that script is inspired from French film La Femme Nikita with director's previous film Rudra also being inspired from the film and that "script comes up with unexpected situations".

References

1992 films
1990s Tamil-language films
Indian action films
Films scored by M. M. Keeravani
Indian films about revenge
1992 action films